Lao Yujing (born 1966) is a retired female badminton player from China.

Career
She won the bronze medal at the 1985 IBF World Championships in mixed doubles with Xinguang. At the China Open in 1987, she lost the final of the women's doubles (5-15 and 2-15) with her teammate Wu Jianqiu to Lin Ying and Guan Weizhen.

External links
China Open 1987
Lao Yujing in Chinese national team

1966 births
Living people
Chinese female badminton players
Badminton players from Guangdong
20th-century Chinese women